The 1988–89 European Cup was the 34th season of the European Cup football club tournament. The competition was won for the first time since 1969, and third time overall, by Milan comfortably in the final against former winners Steaua București.

As the defending champions, PSV Eindhoven received a bye to the second round, but were eliminated by Real Madrid in the quarter-finals. English clubs were still banned, following the Heysel Stadium disaster of 1985, so Liverpool were denied a place in the competition.

Bracket

First round

|}
As defending champions, and due to the ban on English clubs in UEFA competition after the Heysel Stadium disaster reducing the number of teams in the competition, PSV Eindhoven were given a bye to the second round.

First leg

Second leg

Monaco won 2–1 on aggregate.

Porto won 3–2 on aggregate.

Górnik Zabrze won 7–1 on aggregate.

Real Madrid won 4–0 on aggregate.

Celtic won 4–1 on aggregate.

Red Star Belgrade won 8–0 on aggregate.

17 Nëntori won 3–2 on aggregate.

IFK Göteborg won 7–2 on aggregate.

Steaua București won 7–3 on aggregate.

Spartak Moscow won 3–1 on aggregate.

2–2 on aggregate; Club Brugge won on away goals.

3–3 on aggregate; Neuchâtel Xamax won on penalties.

Galatasaray won 3–2 on aggregate.

Milan won 7–2 on aggregate.

Werder Bremen won 5–3 on aggregate.

Second round

|}

1 The second leg in Belgrade was replayed. The original second leg match in Belgrade was stopped by West German referee Dieter Pauly due to thick fog with Red Star leading 1–0. The result was then annulled and a replay took place the very next day. The replay ended in the above 1–1 scoreline.

First leg

Second leg

Werder Bremen won 1–0 on aggregate.

PSV Eindhoven won 5–2 on aggregate.

The match was abandoned in the 57th minute because of dense fog and low visibility with the score at 1–0. It was then voided and a full match replay was ordered for the following day with a 15:00 CET starting time. Furthermore, the replay was to begin with the same starting line-ups as the abandoned match, with the exception of Milan players Pietro Paolo Virdis and Carlo Ancelotti; Virdis had been sent off in the abandoned match, while Ancelotti picked up his second yellow card of the competition, meaning that he had to sit out a match.

2–2 on aggregate; Milan won on penalties.

IFK Göteborg won 4–0 on aggregate.

Steaua București won 5–1 on aggregate.

Monaco won 6–2 on aggregate.

Galatasaray won 5–3 on aggregate.

Real Madrid won 4–2 on aggregate.

Quarter-finals

|}

First leg

Second leg

Real Madrid won 3–2 on aggregate.

Milan won 1–0 on aggregate.

Steaua București won 5–2 on aggregate.

Galatasaray won 2–1 on aggregate.

Semi-finals

|}

First leg

Second leg

Milan won 6–1 on aggregate.

Steaua București won 5–1 on aggregate.

Final

Top goalscorers

See also
1988–89 European Cup Winners' Cup
1988–89 UEFA Cup

References

External links
1988–89 All matches – season at UEFA website
European Cup results at Rec.Sport.Soccer Statistics Foundation
 All scorers 1988–89 European Cup according to protocols UEFA

1988–89 in European football
European Champion Clubs' Cup seasons